Military branch (also service branch or armed service) is according to common standard a subdivision of the national armed forces of a sovereign nation or state.

Types of branches

Unified armed forces 
The Canadian Armed Forces is the unified armed forces of Canada. While it has three environmental commands - namely the Canadian Army, Royal Canadian Navy, and Royal Canadian Air Force - it remains a single military service.

NATO definition
Branch of service (also branch of military service or branch of armed service) refers, according to NATO standards, to a branch, employment of combined forces or parts of a service, below the level of service, military service, or armed service.

See also
 Military organization

References 

 
Military organization
Military science